Francisco Carabalí (born 24 February 1991) is a Venezuelan footballer who plays for Mineros de Guayana as a right back.

References

External links
 
 

1991 births
Living people
Association football defenders
Venezuelan footballers
Venezuelan expatriate footballers
Venezuela international footballers
Trujillanos FC players
Portuguesa F.C. players
A.C.C.D. Mineros de Guayana players
Caracas FC players
Atlético Socopó players
Yaracuyanos FC players
Patriotas Boyacá footballers
Venezuelan Primera División players
Categoría Primera A players
Venezuelan expatriate sportspeople in Colombia
Expatriate footballers in Colombia
21st-century Venezuelan people